Fakılar can refer to:

 Fakılar, Alaca
 Fakılar, Çamlıyayla, a village in Turkey
 Fakılar, Devrekani, a village in Turkey